Watertown is a census-designated place (CDP) in Columbia County, Florida, United States. As of the 2010 census, it had a population of 2,829.

Geography 
Watertown is located at 30°11'11" North, 82°36'30" West (30.186499, -82.608312).

Demographics 

As of the census of 2000, there were 2,837 people, 1,164 households, and 744 families residing in the CDP. The racial makeup of the CDP was 66.94% White, 30.24% African American, 0.56% Native American, 0.25% Asian, 0.04% Pacific Islander, 0.21% from other races, and 1.76% from two or more races.  1.34% of the population were Hispanic or Latino of any race.

There were 1,164 households, out of which 25.5% had children under the age of 18 living with them, 42.4% were married couples living together, 15.2% had a female householder with no husband present, and 36.0% were non-families. 31.4% of all households were made up of individuals, and 15.7% had someone living alone who was 65 years of age or older.  The average household size was 2.41 and the average family size was 3.00.

In the CDP, the population was spread out, with 25.0% under the age of 18, 7.3% from 18 to 24, 24.5% from 25 to 44, 25.1% from 45 to 64, and 18.3% who were 65 years of age or older.  The median age was 40 years.  For every 100 females, there were 93.0 males.  For every 100 females age 18 and over, there were 91.8 males.

The median income for a household in the CDP was $29,402, and the median income for a family was $36,179. Males had a median income of $30,353 versus $21,339 for females. The per capita income for the CDP was $13,044.  17.1% of the population and 12.9% of families were below the poverty line.  Out of the total population, 18.7% of those under the age of 18 and 14.7% of those 65 and older were living below the poverty line.

References

Census-designated places in Columbia County, Florida
Census-designated places in Florida